is a Japanese former diver who competed in the 1964 Summer Olympics.

References

1942 births
Living people
Japanese male divers
Olympic divers of Japan
Divers at the 1964 Summer Olympics
Universiade medalists in diving
Universiade gold medalists for Japan
Medalists at the 1961 Summer Universiade
20th-century Japanese people